Kuwata ( characters for "Morus" and "Paddy field") is a Japanese surname. Notable people with the surname include:

Jiro Kuwata (1935–2020), Japanese manga artist
Keisuke Kuwata (born 1956), Japanese singer
, Japanese basketball player
Masumi Kuwata (born 1968), Japanese baseball player
Matt Kuwata (born 1994), Japanese model, media personality, and musician

Japanese-language surnames

Fictional characters
 Leon Kuwata, a character from the visual novel ''Danganronpa: Trigger Happy Havoc'